is one of the Tokara Islands. It can also refer to:

Dōbutsu Takarajima, a 1971 anime film adaptation of Robert Louis Stevenson's novel Treasure Island
Treasure Island (Takarajima), a 1978 anime television series based on the same novel